Plecoptera reflexa is a species of moth of the family Noctuidae first described by Achille Guenée in 1852. It is mainly found in India, but its range extends west as far as the central and northern parts of the coastal plains of Israel.

It is found in tropical and subtropical oases.

Adults are on wing from May to October. There are multiple generations per year.

The larvae feed on Dalbergia sissoo.

External links

Image

Catocalinae
Moths of Asia
Fauna of Somalia
Moths of the Middle East
Owlet moths of Africa